Formal higher learning in Nepal began with the establishment of Tri-Chandra College in 1918, the first college in the country. Until 1985, Tribhuvan University was the only university in the country. The second university to be founded was Mahendra Sanskrit University. The inception of this university was soon followed by Kathmandu University in 1990, and Purbanchal and Pokhara Universities in 1995 and 1996, respectively. Many schools and colleges are run privately but none of the universities in Nepal are private.

This list includes all notable universities and colleges/campuses in Nepal. Entries are organised by courses offered, and listed in alphabetical order. Some entries that provide multiple courses may be duplicated in each of the relevant categories.

Universities
There are 17 universities in Nepal. They are:

 Tribhuvan University
 Lumbini Technological University
 Far-western University in Kanchanpur
Rajarshi Janak University in Janakpur 
Madhesh University in Birgunj
 Madhesh Agricultural University in Rajbiraj
Gandaki University in Tanahun
 Kathmandu University in Dhulikhel
 Lumbini Bouddha University
 Madan Bhandari University of Science and Technology
 Manmohan Technical University in Budhiganga
 Mid West University in Birendranagar
Nepal Open University in Lalitpur
 Nepal Sanskrit University
 Pokhara University in Pokhara
Purbanchal University in Biratnagar
 Sahid Dasarath Chand Medical Sciences University, Sudurpaschim province
 Agriculture and Forestry University in Rampur, Chitwan

Autonomous Institutes
There are currently four autonomous institute in Nepal. They are:- 

 BPKIHS

 PAHS

 KAHS

Madhesh Institute of Health Sciences (MIHS)

National Academy of Medical Sciences (NAMS)

Colleges

A-Level
A-Level is an Advanced Level GCE (General Certificate of Education) qualification, which is equivalent to a two-year intermediate level study in Nepal.

Notable colleges offering A-Level course in Nepal are:
NAMI College
Budhanilkantha School
 Chelsea International Academy
 St. Xavier's College, Maitighar
 Ace Institute of Management
 Kathmandu University High School
 The British College, Kathmandu
 Trinity International college, Kathmandu
Glacier International college

International bachelor's degree 
 NAMI College, Jorpati, Kathmandu
Softwarica College of it & E-commerce, Mahakabhi marg, Dillibazar
 Islington College, Kamalpokhara, Kathmandu
Itahari International College, Itahari, Sunsari District
The British college, Thapathali, Kathmandu
 Padmashree International College, Tinkune, Kathmandu
Virinchi College International, Kumaripati, Lalitpur
Thames International College,Battisputali,Kathmandu
International Center for Academics, Gyaneshwor,

National Science colleges 
United Academy, Kumaripati, Lalitpur
Xavier Academy
 Amrit Science College (ASCOL), Kathmandu
The British College, Thapathali, Kathmandu
 College of Applied Food and Dairy Technology
Damak Multiple Campus, Damak, Jhapa
 Gomendra Multiple College
 Kantipur City College (KCC)
 Kathmandu College of Management
Makwanpur Multiple Campus
 Mechi Multiple Campus, Bhadrapur, Jhapa
NAMI College, Jorpati, Kathmandu
Nepal Academy of Science and Technology
National College of Computer Studies, affiliated with TU
National Integrated College, Dillibazar, Kathmandu
 National School of Sciences (NIST), Lainchour
 Nobel Academy, New Baneshwor, Kathmandu
 Orchid International College, Gaushala, Kathmandu
 Ramshwaroop Ramsagar Multiple (RRM) Campus, Janakpurdham
 St. Xavier's College, Maitighar
 St. Xavier's School, Jawalakhel 
 Prithvi Narayan Campus, Pokhara 
 Kathmandu Model College, Lalitpur
 Sukuna Multiple Campus, Mornag, Nepal
Bhaktapur Multiple Campus
Khwopa College
New capital college.ratnagar,chitwan

Medical colleges 

 B.P. Koirala Institute of Health Sciences
 Maharajgunj Medical Campus
 Janaki Medical College
 Kathmandu Medical College
 Kathmandu University School of Medical Sciences
 Manipal College of Medical Sciences
 Nepal Medical College (NMC)
 Chitwan Medical College (CMC)
 National Medical College (NMC)
 Birat Medical College (BMC)
 Nepalese Army Institute of Health Sciences
 Kist Medical College
 College of Medical Sciences
 Gandaki Medical College
 Nobel Medical College
 Universal College of Medical Sciences
 Patan Academy of Health Sciences
 Karnali Academy of Health Sciences
Pokhara Academy of Health Sciences
National Academy of Medical Sciences Kathmandu, Nepal
Nobel Medical College
Devdaha Medical College
Manmohan Memorial Institute of Health Sciences

Engineering colleges
Acme Engineering College, Sitapaila, Kathmandu
Advanced College of Engineering and Management, Kupondole, Lalitpur
Far-Western University, School of Engineering, Mahendranagar, Kanchanpur
Central Campus of Engineering, Birendranagar, Surkhet
Everest Engineering College, Sanepa Lalitpur 
Gandaki College of Engineering and Science
Hillside College of Engineering, affiliated with PoU
Himalaya College of Engineering, affiliated with TU
Kantipur Engineering College, affiliated with TU
 Kathmandu Engineering College
 Khwopa Engineering College
 Lumbini Engineering College
 National College of Engineering, Talchhikhel, Lalitpur
 Nepal College of Information Technology
 Nepal Engineering College
 Oxford college of engineering and management
 Pashchimanchal Campus
 Pokhara Engineering College
 Pulchowk campus
 Purwanchal Campus, Dharan
 Kantipur City College (KCC)
 Katmandu Institute of Technology, affiliated with CTEVT
Kantipur International College, College of Engineering, affiliated with purbanchal university
Madan Bhandari Memorial Academy Nepal, Urlabari,Morang (School Of Engineering, Pokhara University) (Joint Constituent College)

Management colleges
 United Academy, Kumaripati, Lalitpur
 Global College of Management, Kathmandu
 Rajarshi Janak Campus, Janakpurdham
 Sagarmatha Multiple College
 Peoples Campus
 Modern college of management
 Nation College of Computer Science
 Prime College
 Aastha College of Management
 Global Educational Academy
 Unique College of Science and Management
 Vishwa Adarsha College
 Medhavi College
KIST College of Management
BOSTON INTERNATIONAL COLLEGE

Hotel Management college

 United Academy, Kumaripati, Lalitpur
 Nepal Academy of Tourism and Hotel Management(NATHM), Ravibhawan, Kathmandu

References 

Universities
Nepal, list of universities in
Universities and colleges in Nepal
Nepal
Universities in Nepal